Brantley may refer to:

Places

United States
 Brantley, Alabama, a town
 Brantley County, Georgia
 Brantley Lake, a lake in southwestern New Mexico

Persons with the given name
 Brantley Coile, American inventor
 Brantley Gilbert (born 1985), American singer-songwriter
 Brantley York (1805–1891), American cleric and educator

Persons with the middle name
 W. Brantley Harvey Jr. (1930-2018), American lawyer and politician
 W. Brantley Harvey Sr. (1893-1981), American lawyer and politician

Persons with the surname
 Ben Brantley (born 1954), American journalist
 Betsy Brantley (born 1955), American actress
 Bobby Brantley (born 1948), American politician
 Caleb Brantley (born 1994), American football player
 Charles Brantley (1924–2016), Tennessee Walking Horse breeder
 Chris Brantley (born 1970), American football player
 Cliff Brantley (born 1968), American baseball player
 Curtis Brantley (born 1940), American politician and educator
 Jarrell Brantley (born 1996), American basketball player 
 Jeff Brantley (born 1963), American baseball player
 Jennifer Brantley, American singer-songwriter
 John Brantley (born 1989), American football player
 John Brantley (linebacker) (born 1965), American football player
 Larry Brantley, American voice actor and comedian
 Mark Brantley (born 1969), St Kitts and Nevis politician
 Maurice Brantley (born 1968), American boxer
 Michael Brantley (born 1987), American baseball player
 Mickey Brantley (born 1961), American baseball player
 Mike Brantley, American bluegrass musician
 Rosemary Brantley, American fashion designer
 Scot Brantley (born 1958), American football player
 Susan Brantley (born 1958), American geologist and geochemist
 Theodore M. Brantley (1851–1922), American jurist
 Tom Brantley (born 1970), American jazz musician
 William F. Brantley (1830–1870), American lawyer and soldier
 William Gordon Brantley (1860–1934), American politician and lawyer

See also
 Brantly (disambiguation)